Hands-On Mobile is a wireless entertainment company, established in 2001.

The company develops, publishes and distributes mobile content via network operators and portals. It offers its content in or via Java ME, BREW, SMS, MMS, and WAP in English, French, Italian, Spanish, German, Portuguese, Czech, Chinese and Korean.

Hands-On Mobile is a private company headquartered in San Francisco, California. It has further offices in San Diego, London and Manchester (UK), Madrid (Spain), Paris (France), Munich (Germany), Beijing and Shanghai (China), and São Paulo (Brazil).

Hands-On Mobile's investors include eFund, Draper Fisher Jurvetson, General Catalyst Partners, Institutional Venture Partners and Bessemer Venture Partners.

History
Hands-On Mobile was co-founded by Daniel Kranzler, Christophe Watkins, Eric Bilange, David Bluhm, wireless industry pioneers. Hands-On Mobile grew organically  as well as through business combination & symbian mobile gaming  when it acquired several leading mobile entertainment developer and technology companies: nGame Ltd and Blue Beck of the UK, Mobilemode Ltd European operations, FingerTwitch (a U.S. mobile technology company), and two mobile entertainment content development companies in China.
In 2008, Hands On sold its Korean operations to EA, and sold its European operations to Connect 2 Media.
Then in 2010 Hands On sold its US applications business to GoTV.

Senior officers
 Judy Wade, CEO
 Harjeet Singh Director

Partners

Notable customers
AT&T, Sprint/Nextel, T-Mobile, Verizon Wireless, Alltel, US Cellular, Bell Mobility,

Notable media partners
Activision, Billboard, CBS, NASCAR, NBA, and World Poker Tour.

Published applications

Heroes Lore:Wind of Soltia
Acquaria
Alien Fish Exchange
Amazing Spider-Man: Webslinger
Barry Bonds Home run History
Baseball 2005 by CBS Sportsline
Baywatch Beach Volleyball
Blade: Trinity
California Games
Call of Duty
Call of Duty 2
Call of Duty 3
CBS Sportsline Track & Field
Chip's Challenge
Connect 4
Darkest Fear: Grim Oak's Hospital (US)
Ducati Extreme
Duckshot
Elektra: Assassin
Face-Off Sergei Fedorov Hockey
Fantastic Four
Ghost Rider
Gold Mahjong
Guitar Hero III Mobile
Gumball 3000
Heroes Lore
IHRA Drag Racing
Impossible Mission
Iron Man
IQ Academy
Largo Winch
LEGO Bricks
LEGO Racers
LEGO World Soccer
Little Miss Naughty
Lucky Luke Outlaws
Ludo
Milton Bradley Board Games
Monopoly Tycoon
NCAA Football 1st down and 10
Operation
Popeye Kart Racing
Pro Bowling
Pro Euro Football
Renaissance
Riverboat Blackjack
Sabrina, the Teenage Witch
Santa Claus Revolution
Scratch City Pool
Sudoku Garden
Star Trek Nemesis
Summer Games
Super Putt
The Elder Scrolls Travels: Stormhold
The Incredible Hulk: Rampage
The Italian Job
Top Gun
Top Gun 2
Top Gun: Gulf Crisis
Tour Championship Tennis by Venus Williams
Treasure Chest Slots
True Crime: New York City
True Crime: Streets of LA
Ultimate Spider-Man
Universal Monsters: Dracula (a/k/a Vampire Bloodline)
Winter Games
Woody Woodpecker: Wacky Challenge
World Poker Tour 7-Card Stud
World Poker Tour Texas Hold'em
X-Men 2: Battle
X-Men: Last Stand
X-Men: Rise of Apocalypse
X-Men 3 Mindmaze

References

External links
 

Mobile software
Mobile game companies
Entertainment companies established in 2001
Software companies established in 2001
Telecommunications companies established in 2001